Li Bing may refer to:

 Li Bing (Qin) ( 3rd century BC), hydraulic engineer and official of the state of Qin
 Li Bing (Northern Zhou) (died 572), Northern Zhou official 
 Li Bing (footballer) (born 1969), Chinese footballer and team manager
 Li Bing (handballer) (born 1980), Chinese handballer
 Li Bing (powerlifter) (born 1974), Chinese Paralympic powerlifter

See also
 Bing Lee, retail chain
 Li Bingbing, actress

hu:Li Ping (egyértelműsítő lap)